Añal is a ghost town in De Baca County, in the U.S. state of New Mexico. Añal was located between Alamo and Fort Sumner, on Arroyo de Anil, but the town's precise location is unknown to the GNIS.

A post office called Anal (without the tilde) was established in 1916, and remained in operation until 1934.

References

Geography of De Baca County, New Mexico
Ghost towns in New Mexico